M.J. O'Neill's is a bar and restaurant in Dublin, Ireland. It occupies 2 Suffolk Street and adjacent buildings, continuing round the corner into Church Lane. From 1875 it was owned by the Hogan Brothers, until M.J. O’Neill bought and renamed the premises in 1927.

The part in Church Lane was the site of a printing house, where William Butler published The Volunteers Journal and Irish Herald in 1783, and in 1789 Arthur O’Connor published The Press, supporting Wolfe Tone’s republican views.

The corner structure is a four-storey, vaguely of the Arts and Crafts Movement, red-brick and early twentieth century, with Tudor-style projecting bay windows. There is a decorated iron three-dials clock on the Suffolk Street frontage. The building is protected and in a conservation area.

The original structure was divided into definite areas: a “cocktail bar” in the corner for the gentry, a public bar off Suffolk Street, and a back bar. The next-door premises in Church Lane have been added, as a carvery, and the interior has been opened up. A small snug, immediately inside the Church Lane entrance, was a venue for the “Fabians” of the early 1960s and for later left-wing students from Trinity College, Dublin.

See also
 List of pubs in Dublin

References

External links
Official Website

Restaurants in Dublin (city)
Pubs in Dublin (city)